Events from 2021 in Hawaii.

Incumbents 

 Governor: David Ige

Events 
Ongoing – COVID-19 pandemic in Hawaii

 January 31 – Shirlene Ostrov resigns as chairwoman of the Hawaii Republican Party following a series of tweets posted by vice chairman Edwin Boyette on the party's Twitter account defending people who supported the QAnon conspiracy theory. Additionally, Boyette resigned on January 24 after the tweets were posted the day before.
 March 8 – Hawaii reports their first case of the COVID-19 501.V2 variant that originated in South Africa in a person from Oahu with no known travel history.
 May 13 – Hawaiian Governor David Ige says that the state will keep its mask mandate despite the Centers for Disease Control and Prevention saying that fully vaccinated Americans can go to places without wearing a mask.
 June 14 – Hawaii reports their first case of the Lineage B.1.617 Delta variant in an Oahu resident who traveled to Nevada.
 September 8 – The Alohilani Resort in Honolulu will require COVID-19 vaccinations for workers, becoming the first resort hotel in Hawaii to do so. The mandate will take effect on October 15.
 October 23 – Scientists at the University of Hawaiʻi at Mānoa announce the discovery of 2M0437b, one of the youngest exoplanets ever found at a distant star. The exoplanet was discovered using the Subaru Telescope at the observatory on Mauna Kea.

Deaths 

 January 26 – Billy Kenoi, 52, American politician, mayor of Hawaii County (2008–2016)
 February 4 – William Bains-Jordan, 104, American politician, member of the Hawaii House of Representatives (1959–1962)
 February 20 – Dean Ho, 88, American professional wrestler (WWWF, PNW, NWA Hawaii), complications from chronic traumatic encephalopathy
 July 3 – Haunani-Kay Trask, 71, American Hawaiian nationalist and author
 July 12 – Bob Nakata, 80, American politician, member of the Hawaii House of Representatives (1983–1987) and Senate (1999–2003)

References 

2021 in Hawaii
2020s in Hawaii
Years of the 21st century in Hawaii
Hawaii